Dylan Howard is an American basketball coach. He is the former head coach of the Alabama A&M Bulldogs men's basketball team.

Playing career
Howard played college basketball at UAB under Gene Bartow. He was part of two Blazers' NCAA Tournament appearances in 1986 and 1987, as well as the team's 1989 NIT semifinals appearance.

Coaching career
Beginning his coaching career in his hometown of Fort Wayne, Indiana, Howard became an assistant coach at the University of Saint Francis where he was on staff for four seasons before joining the coaching staff at Robert Morris. In 2001, Howard was named the head coach at Division III Hardin–Simmons. In his tenure with the Cowboys, Howard compiled a 78–103 record, while guiding the team to its first-ever league tournament appearance and league finals appearance, being named American Southwest Conference Coach of the Year in 2005. Howard would return to the Division I ranks joining Sean Woods's staff at Mississippi Valley State from 2008 to 2011. After a one-year stint as head coach at North Park University, Howard reunited with Woods at Morehead State.

In 2017, Howard became an assistant coach at Alabama A&M under Donnie Marsh. When Marsh departed for an assistant coaching position at Florida Gulf Coast in 2018, Howard was named the interim head coach for the 2018–19 season. After a 5–27 record under the interim title, Alabama A&M lifted the interim title.

Head coaching record

NCAA DIII

NCAA DI

References

Living people
Alabama A&M Bulldogs basketball coaches
American men's basketball coaches
Basketball coaches from Indiana
Basketball players from Fort Wayne, Indiana
Mississippi Valley State Delta Devils basketball coaches
Morehead State Eagles men's basketball coaches
Robert Morris Colonials men's basketball coaches
Sportspeople from Fort Wayne, Indiana
UAB Blazers men's basketball players
Year of birth missing (living people)